The Coronation was a streamlined express passenger train run by the London and North Eastern Railway between  and . Named to mark the coronation of King George VI and Queen Elizabeth, it was inaugurated on 5 July 1937. The down train (northbound) left London at 4 pm and arrived in Edinburgh at 10 pm; the up train (southbound) ran half an hour later.

Design
The design was based on the very successful streamlined train, The Silver Jubilee, built in 1935, but instead of being painted silver it was given a two-tone blue livery. Internally it was decorated in the Art Deco style.

Formation
The train was formed of four two-car articulated units, with a 'beaver-tail' observation car added in summer, marshalled as follows on a southbound service from Edinburgh to London, the northbound service from London to Edinburgh would be marshalled the opposite way round with the Locomotive and tender, and observation car being coupled to the opposite ends (see image right): 

 Locomotive and tender
 Brake Third + Kitchen Third
 Open First + Open First 
 Open Third + Kitchen Third
 Open Third + Brake Third
 Observation car

The train was usually hauled by a streamlined LNER Class A4 'Pacific' locomotive, in a special Garter Blue livery with red wheels. From October 1937 this became the standard livery of the class.

The observation cars had a distinctive 'beaver tail' shape. They ran in this form until the Second World War when the train's coaches were put in store. In 1948 various vehicles returned to service as general passenger stock, but they never ran as a full set again - the observation cars were transferred to the West Highland line in 1956. Their original observation end was found to give limited views, so British Railways rebuilt them with a more angled end and added larger windows, running in this form from 1959 to 1968. Both the observation cars have survived and are being restored by Railway Vehicle Preservations Ltd, which has restored one to its original condition, the other as rebuilt.

See also
Coaches of the London and North Eastern Railway
East Anglian

References

External links

The train in miniature
Science and Society Picture Library
Railway Vehicle Preservations Ltd
 , illustrated contemporary description of the Coronation and Coronation Scot

Named passenger trains of the London and North Eastern Railway
Railway services introduced in 1937